The following is a list of notable events and releases that happened in 2015 in music in the United States.

Notable events

January 
12 – Lady Antebellum performed the National Anthem at the first ever College Football Playoff National Championship Game.
 30 – The Offspring set a record for longest time between #1 singles on the Mainstream Rock charts with Coming for You, their first since Gone Away in 1997.

February 
1 – Idina Menzel performed the National Anthem and Katy Perry performed at the halftime show during Super Bowl XLIX on February 1, making it the most watched, highest-rated, and most tweeted per second halftime show.
8 – The 57th Grammy Awards, hosted by LL Cool J, took place at the Staples Center in Los Angeles. British singer Sam Smith won the most awards with four including; Record of the Year, Song of the Year, Best Pop Vocal Album, and Best New Artist. Beck's Morning Phase won Album of the Year.

March 
4 – Shania Twain announced that she will be going on her first tour in eleven years. The Rock This Country Tour began on June 5, 2015, and is billed as her farewell tour. She also plans on releasing her first studio album in thirteen years later in the year.
25 – One Direction announces that Zayn Malik had left the group. 
29 – The 2nd iHeartRadio Music Awards took place at the Shrine Auditorium in Los Angeles. Taylor Swift and Justin Timberlake were among the winners.

April 
19 – The 50th ACM Awards were held at AT&T Stadium in Arlington, Texas, hosted by Luke Bryan and Blake Shelton.

May 
12 – Joey Alexander released his debut jazz instrumental album, My Favorite Things, which led him to a double grammy nomination at the 58th Annual Grammy Awards. Becoming the year's youngest Grammy nominee.
13 – Nick Fradiani was named winner of the fifteenth season of American Idol. Clark Beckham was named winner runner-up.
17 – The 2015 Billboard Music Awards were held at the MGM Grand Garden Arena.
19 – Sawyer Fredericks was named winner of the eighth season of The Voice. Meghan Linsey was named runner-up. Joshua Davis and Koryn Hawthorne finishing third and fourth place respectively.
 - Faith No More released their first studio album in 18 years, Sol Invictus.
30 - Madonna gets her record 45th number-one song on the dance charts, with the song Ghosttown, surpassing George Strait for the most number-one entries on any kind of Billboard chart.

June 
8 – The music video for "Dark Horse" by Katy Perry reached 1 billion views on Vevo, making it the first music video by a female artist to do so and the third music video overall to do so. It was the third most-viewed YouTube video of all time, and the most-watched video by a female artist until "Blank Space" by Taylor Swift took both records a month later.
16 – Hilary Duff released her first album Breathe In. Breathe Out. in seven years. It hit number 5 in the US.

July 
10 – Starting on this day albums will now be released on Fridays instead of Tuesdays in America. Some reasons for the change is to help prevent illegal downloads and "In the digital world, you can't make consumers wait".
 Veruca Salt released their first studio album in 9 years, Ghost Notes. This is also the first album to feature the band's original lineup since 1997's Eight Arms to Hold You.
30 – The reunited Savatage played their first show in thirteen years at Wacken Open Air in Germany, which took place from July 30 to August 1.

August 
21 – Canadian pop star Carly Rae Jepsen released her third album, Emotion. It had universal acclaim and was included on several year-end lists from publications such as NPR, NME, Complex, and The Village Voice.
30 – The 2015 MTV Video Music Awards were held at the Microsoft Theater at L.A. Live in Los Angeles. Taylor Swift was the big winner of the night with four awards, including Video of the Year for "Bad Blood".

September 
11 – Slayer released their first album in six years, Repentless. Their album was their first since the death of founding guitarist Jeff Hanneman in 2013 and subsequently proved to be the band's final album following their disbandment in 2019.
18–19 – The 2015 iHeartRadio Music Festival took place at the MGM Grand Garden Arena in Las Vegas.

October 
2 – Janet Jackson releases Unbreakable her first album since 2008's Discipline to widespread critical acclaim. The album goes on to top the Billboard 200 chart. 
23 – The music video for Adele's "Hello" broke the Vevo Record for the most views within a 24-hour span with 27.7 million views, beating out the previous record held by Taylor Swift's "Bad Blood". It also broke the record for shortest time to attain 100 million Vevo views, previously held by Miley Cyrus' "Wrecking Ball". In 2017, Swift took back the record with 43.2 million views with the music video for Look What You Made Me Do.

November 
2 – Adele's comeback single "Hello" became the first song with over a million digital sales in a week.
7 – the 49th Country Music Association Awards was held at the Bridgestone Arena in Nashville. Brad Paisley and Carrie Underwood hosted for the eighth year in a row.
9 – Chester Bennington amicably departs from Stone Temple Pilots as lead singer to focus more on Linkin Park. 
13 - Justin Bieber released his fourth album, Purpose (Justin Bieber album) making his sixth album to debut at number 1 on the Billboard 200 chart. Every song on this album has hit the US Billboard Hot 100 Chart. It was supported by four singles: "What Do You Mean?", "Sorry", "Love Yourself", and "Company". The former three singles all reached number one on the Canadian Hot 100, US Billboard Hot 100 and the UK Singles Chart. The album was among the best-selling albums of both 2015 and 2016.
22 – The 2015 American Music Awards was held at the Microsoft Theatre in Los Angeles.
28 – Billboard reported Adele's 25 sold 3.38 million in pure album sales in its first week of release, according to Nielsen Music. That's the largest single sales week for an album since Nielsen began tracking point-of-sale music purchases in 1991, surpassing the previous single-week sales record, held by NSYNC's No Strings Attached (2.42 million sold in the week ending March 26, 2000).

December 
3 – Former Stone Temple Pilots & Velvet Revolver singer Scott Weiland is found dead on his tour bus in Bloomington, Minnesota at the age of 48 while on tour with his band, the Wildabouts.
8 – Nominations for the 58th Annual Grammy Awards were announced, with Kendrick Lamar leading the list.
15 – Jordan Smith was named winner of the ninth season of The Voice. Emily Ann Roberts was named runner-up. Barrett Baber and Jeffery Austin finishing third and fourth place respectively.

Bands formed 
Almost Monday
Dead & Company
Saint Asonia
DNCE
Zen From Mars

Bands reformed 

13th Floor Elevators
The Academy Is...
A-ha
Aiden
Alexisonfire
Armor for Sleep
At the Drive-In
The Black Eyed Peas
Brooks & Dunn
The Corrs
Daphne and Celeste
Dashboard Confessional
Digable Planets
Disturbed
Evanescence
Good Charlotte
LCD Soundsystem
Lush
The Matches
Pist.On
The Promise Ring
Royal Trux
Savatage
Sherwood
Supertramp
Thrice
Underoath
Ween

Bands on hiatus 
The Black Keys
Fireworks
Framing Hanley
fun.
The Gaslight Anthem
The Ghost Inside
Guns N' Roses
Pinback
Staind
Teenage Bottlerocket
Yeah Yeah Yeahs
One Direction

Bands disbanded 

3 Inches of Blood
Avi Buffalo
The Black Crowes
California Breed
CBS Orchestra
Cobra Starship
Device
Erase Errata
Flesh for Lulu
Framing Hanley
Funeral For a Friend
G.R.L.
I, the Breather
Kill Hannah
Klaxons
Maybeshewill
Mean Creek
MellowHype
Mötley Crüe
Motörhead
Neutral Milk Hotel
Noah and the Whale
Obits
Odd Future
The Presidents of the United States of America
The Replacements
Rise to Remain
The Rosso Sisters
Scott Weiland and the Wildabouts
Sleeper Agent
Tangerine Dream
Texas in July
The Weakerthans

Albums released in 2015

January

February

March

April

May

June

July

August
{| class="wikitable" style="text-align: left;"
|-
!Date
!Album
!Artist
!Genre(s)
|-
|rowspan="4"|7
|Kill the Lights
|Luke Bryan
|Country, country pop
|-
|Compton
|Dr. Dre
|Hip hop
|-
|21
|Hunter Hayes
|Country, country pop
|-
|Love Is Free
|Robyn & La Bagatelle Magique
|Pop
|-
|rowspan="3"|14
|Psycadelik Thoughtz
|B.o.B.
|Hip Hop
|-
|Venom
|Bullet for My Valentine
|Thrash metal,<ref>{{cite web|title=Bullet for My Valentine Announce New Album Producer: 'We Wanted Someone to Go 'It's Not Metal Enough|url=http://www.ultimate-guitar.com/news/upcoming_releases/bullet_for_my_valentine_announce_new_album_producer_we_wanted_someone_to_go_its_not_metal_enough.html?no_takeover|website=Ultimate Guitar|accessdate=21 May 2015|date=23 October 2013}}</ref> heavy metal, metalcore
|-
|Vikings|New Politics
|Alternative rock
|-
|rowspan="9"|21
| E·MO·TION| Carly Rae Jepsen
| Pop
|-
|Immortalized|Disturbed
|Heavy metal, alternative metal
|-
|The Meth Lab|Method Man
|Hip Hop
|-
|Wild Ones|Kip Moore
|Country
|-
|I Cry When I Laugh|Jess Glynne
|R&B, house, dance-pop
|-
|III|JoJo
|R&B, pop, dance-pop
|-
|The Awakening|P.O.D.
|Christian metal, nu metal
|-
|Right Here, Right Now|Jordin Sparks
|R&B, pop
|-
|The Great Unknown|Rob Thomas
|Pop rock, alternative rock
|-
|rowspan="3"|28
|Badlands|Halsey
|Electropop, Indie Pop
|-
|Beauty Behind the Madness|The Weeknd
|Pop, R&B, PBR&B
|-
|Inanimate Objects|Atlas Genius
|Indie rock
|-
|30
|Miley Cyrus & Her Dead Petz|Miley Cyrus 
|Psychedelic pop, Experimental pop
|}

September

October

November

December

 Top songs on record 

Billboard Hot 100 No. 1 Songs
 "Bad Blood" – Taylor Swift feat. Kendrick Lamar 
 "Blank Space" – Taylor Swift 
 "Can't Feel My Face" – The Weeknd 
 "Cheerleader" – OMI 
 "Hello" – Adele 
 "The Hills" – The Weeknd 
 "See You Again" – Wiz Khalifa feat. Charlie Puth 
 "Uptown Funk" – Mark Ronson feat. Bruno Mars 
 "What Do You Mean?" – Justin Bieber 

Billboard Hot 100 Top 20 Hits
All songs that reached the Top 20 on the Billboard'' Hot 100 chart during the year, complete with peak chart placement.

Deaths 

 January 1 – Jeff Golub, 59, jazz guitarist
 January 2 – Little Jimmy Dickens, 94, country singer
 January 4 – Lance Diamond, 72, singer
 January 8 
Andraé Crouch, 72, gospel singer-songwriter and producer
Curtis Lee, 75, singer-songwriter
 January 10 
Tim Drummond, 75, rock bass player and songwriter
George Probert, 87, jazz saxophonist and clarinet player (Firehouse Five Plus Two)
 January 12 
Frank Glazer, 99, pianist and composer
A. J. Masters, 64, singer-songwriter and guitarist
 January 15 
Ervin Drake, 95, songwriter
Kim Fowley, 75, singer-songwriter, producer, and manager
 January 18 
Cynthia Layne, 51, jazz singer-songwriter
Dallas Taylor, 66, rock drummer (Manassas, Clear Light)
 January 19 
John Bilezikjian, 66, oud player
Ward Swingle, 87, jazz singer (Les Double Six)
 January 20 – Rose Marie McCoy, 92, songwriter
 January 27 – Neil Levang, 83, guitarist and banjo player
 January 29 – Rod McKuen, 81, singer-songwriter
 January 31 – Don Covay, 76, singer-songwriter
 February 1 – Anita Darian, 87, soprano
 February 2 
Joseph Alfidi, 65, pianist, composer, and conductor
The Jacka, 37, rapper (Mob Figaz)
Zane Musa, 36, saxophonist
 February 3
Mary Healy, 96, variety entertainer, singer, and actress
William Thomas McKinley, 76, pianist and composer
 February 7 – Joe B. Mauldin, 74, bass player (The Crickets)
 February 8 – Keith Knudsen, 56, singer-songwriter and drummer 
 February 9 – Marvin David Levy, 82, composer
 February 12 
Sam Andrew, 73, singer-songwriter and guitarist (Big Brother and the Holding Company)
John-Edward Kelly, 56, saxophonist and conductor
Mosie Lister, 93, singer-songwriter (The Statesmen Quartet)
Richie Pratt, 71, jazz drummer and composer
 February 14 – Hulon, 58, jazz saxophonist
 February 16 – Lesley Gore, 68, singer-songwriter
 February 18 – Dave Cloud, 58, singer-songwriter
 February 21 – Clark Terry, 94, jazz trumpeter and composer
 February 23 – Ron Edgar, 68, drummer (The Music Machine)
 February 24 – Robert Belfour, 74, blues singer-songwriter and guitarist
 February 27 – Tod Dockstader, 82, composer
 February 28 – Ezra Laderman, 90, classical composer
 March 1 – Orrin Keepnews, 91, record producer, co-founded Riverside Records
 March 8 – Lew Soloff, 71, trumpet player and composer (Blood, Sweat & Tears and Mingus Big Band)
 March 9 
Jerry Brightman, 61, guitarist (The Buckaroos)
Wayne Kemp, 73, country singer and guitarist
 March 11 – Jimmy Greenspoon, 67, singer-songwriter and keyboard player (Three Dog Night)
 March 15 – Mike Porcaro, 59, rock bass player (Toto)
 March 16 
Bruce Crump, 57, rock drummer (Molly Hatchet and Gator Country)
Don Robertson, 92, pianist and songwriter
 March 18 – Samuel Charters, 85, record producer
 March 19 – Michael Brown, 65, keyboard player and songwriter (The Left Banke)
 March 20
Paul Jeffrey, 81, jazz saxophonist
A. J. Pero, 55, rock drummer (Twisted Sister and Adrenaline Mob)
 March 21 – Miriam Bienstock, 92, record executive
 March 22 – Norman Scribner, 79, pianist, composer, and conductor
 March 24 – Scott Clendenin, 48, bass player (Death and Control Denied)
 March 27 
B.J. Crosby, 63, jazz singer
Johnny Helms, 80, jazz trumpet player and bandleader
 March 30 – Preston Ritter, 65, drummer (The Electric Prunes)
 March 31 – Ralph Sharon, 91, pianist, composer, and conductor
 April 1 – Billy Butler, 69, soul singer-songwriter and guitarist
 April 2 – Doug Sax, 78, sound engineer
 April 3 – Bob Burns, 64, rock drummer (Lynyrd Skynyrd)
 April 5 
Richard LaSalle, 97, pianist and composer
Julie Wilson, 90, singer
 April 6 
 Ray Charles, 96, singer-songwriter and conductor 
 Milton DeLugg, 96, jazz accordion player and composer
 April 7 – Stan Freberg, 88, recording artist
 April 9 – Tut Taylor, 91, bluegrass guitarist (Dixie Gentlemen)
 April 10 – Keith McCormack, 74, singer-songwriter and guitarist
 April 14 – Percy Sledge, 74, singer
 April 15 – Billy Ray Hearn, 85, record executive, founded Sparrow Records and Myrrh Records
 April 16 – Johnny Kemp, 55, singer
 April 19 – Bernard Stollman, 85, record executive, founded ESP-Disk
 April 21 – Wally Lester, 73, singer (The Skyliners)
 April 24 – Sid Tepper, 96, songwriter
 April 27 
Jack Ely, 71, singer and guitarist (The Kingsmen)
Marty Napoleon, 93, jazz pianist
 April 30 – Ben E. King, 76, singer-songwriter and producer (The Drifters)
 May 1 – Grace Lee Whitney, 85, singer
 May 2 – Guy Carawan, 87, singer and musicologist
 May 5 – Craig Gruber, 63, bass player (Rainbow, Elf, Bible Black, and Raven Lord)
 May 6 – Jerome Cooper, 68, jazz drummer
 May 9 – Johnny Gimble, 88, singer-songwriter and fiddler
 May 10 – Victor Salvi, 95, classical harpist
 May 11 – Stan Cornyn, 81, record executive
 May 12 – Bobby Jameson, 70, singer-songwriter
 May 13 – Robert Drasnin, 87, clarinet player and composer
 May 14 – B.B. King, 89, blues singer-songwriter, guitarist, and producer
 May 15 – Ortheia Barnes, 70, singer
 May 17 
Chinx, 31, rapper
Tranquility Bass, 47, rapper
 May 18 – Elbert West, 47, country singer-songwriter
 May 19 – Bruce Lundvall, 79, record executive
 May 20 – Bob Belden, 58, saxophonist, composer, conductor, and producer
 May 21 – Louis Johnson, 60, bass player (The Brothers Johnson)
 May 24 – Marcus Belgrave, 78, jazz trumpet player
 May 26 
Rocky Frisco, 77, pianist
Art Thieme, 73, folk singer
 May 28 – Steven Gerber, 66, composer
 May 30 – Jim Bailey, 77, singer
 May 31
 Nico Castel, 83, tenor
 Will Holt, 86, singer-songwriter
 Slim Richey, 77, jazz guitarist and fiddler
 June 1 – Jean Ritchie, 92, folk singer-songwriter
 June 6 – Ronnie Gilbert, 88, folk singer-songwriter (The Weavers)
 June 8 – Paul Bacon, 91, jazz musician
 June 9 – Pumpkinhead, 39, rapper
 June 11
Jim Ed Brown, 81, country singer-songwriter (The Browns)
Ornette Coleman 85, jazz saxophonist, violinist, trumpet player, and composer
 June 12 – Monica Lewis, 93, singer
 June 13
Buddy Boudreaux, 97, jazz saxophonist and clarinet player
Big Time Sarah, 62, blues singer
 June 16 – Mighty Sam McClain, 72, singer-songwriter
 June 19 – Harold Battiste, 83, saxophonist, pianist, and composer
 June 21 – Gunther Schuller, 89, horn player, composer, and conductor
 June 22 
Joseph de Pasquale, 95, viola player
James Horner, 61, composer and conductor
 June 27 – Chris Squire, 67, singer-songwriter and bass player (Yes, Conspiracy, The Syn, and XYZ)
 July 1 – Red Lane, 76, country singer-songwriter
 July 2 – Roy C. Bennett, 96, songwriter
 July 6 
Julio Angel, 69, singer
Camille Bob, 77, singer and drummer
 July 8 – Ernie Maresca, 76, singer-songwriter and producer (The Regents)
 July 9 – Michael Masser, 74, songwriter and producer
 July 10 
Hussein Fatal, 38, rapper (Outlawz)
Jon Vickers,  88, opera singer
 July 11 – Joey Robinson, Jr., 53, Sugar Hill Records executive (West Street Mob)
 July 13 – Arthur G. Wright, 78, soul guitarist
 July 14 – Dave Somerville, 81, singer (The Diamonds)
 July 15  
Alan Curtis, 80, harpsichord player and conductor
Howard Rumsey, 97, jazz bassist
 July 18 – Buddy Buie, 74, songwriter and producer
 July 19 
Van Alexander, 100, composer and bandleader
Carmino Ravosa, 85, pianist and composer
 July 20 – Wayne Carson, 72, singer-songwriter and producer
 July 21 
Mitch Aliotta, 71, bass player (Rotary Connection and Aliotta Haynes Jeremiah)
Theodore Bikel, 91, folk singer-songwriter
Paul Freeman, 79, conductor
Justin Lowe, 32, metal guitarist (After the Burial)
 July 22
Don Joyce, 71, singer (Negativland)
Daron Norwood, 49, country singer-songwriter
 July 26 
Bobbi Kristina Brown, 22, singer
Vic Firth, 85, drummer
 July 27 – Rickey Grundy, 56, gospel singer-songwriter
 July 29 – Buddy Emmons, 78, guitarist
 July 30 – Lynn Anderson, 67, country singer
 July 31 – Pamela Brandt, 68, country-rock bassist, singer and songwriter (The Deadly Nightshade)
 August 2 – J. Durward Morsch, 94, trombonist and composer
 August 4 – Billy Sherrill, 78, songwriter and producer
 August 5 – Raphy Leavitt, 66, composer and conductor
 August 8 – Sean Price, 43, rapper (Boot Camp Clik and Heltah Skeltah)
 August 11 – Eddie Cusic, 89, blues singer-songwriter and guitarist 
 August 13 – Harold Ousley, 86, saxophonist and flute player
 August 14 – Bob Johnston, 83 record producer
 August 15 – Danny Sembello, 52, songwriter and producer
 August 27 – George Cleve, 79, conductor
 September 1 – Boomer Castleman, 70, singer-songwriter and guitarist
 September 2 – Brianna Lea Pruett, 32, singer-songwriter
 September 5 – Frederick "Dennis" Greene, 66, singer (Sha Na Na)
 September 7 – Susan Allen, 64, harp player
 September 13 – Gary Richrath, 65, guitarist and songwriter (REO Speedwagon)
 September 16 – Peggy Jones, 75, guitarist
 September 18 – Daniel Kyre, 21, guitarist (Cyndago)
 September 21 – Ben Cauley, 76, trumpet player and songwriter (The Bar-Kays)
 September 27
Wilton Felder, 75, saxophonist and bass player (The Crusaders)
Denise Lor, 86, singer
 September 28 – Frankie Ford, 76, singer
 September 29 
Benjamin Hutto, 67, conductor
Phil Woods, 83, saxophonist and composer
 October 2 – Willie Akins, 76, jazz saxophonist
 October 4 – Dave Pike, 77, vibraphone player and composer
 October 6 
Smokey Johnson, 78, drummer
Billy Joe Royal, 73, pop and country singer
 October 9
Koopsta Knicca, 40, rapper (Three 6 Mafia)
Larry Rosen, 75, jazz producer
 October 10
Steve Mackay, 66, saxophonist (The Stooges)
Robbin Thompson, 66, singer-songwriter (Steel Mill)
 October 11 – Smokin' Joe Kubek, 58, guitarist and songwriter
 October 13 – Skatemaster Tate, 56, singer and producer
 October 16 – John Jennings, 61, guitarist and producer
 October 18 – Frank Watkins, 47, bass player (Gorgoroth and Obituary)
 October 20 – Cory Wells, 74, singer (Three Dog Night)
 October 22 – Mark Murphy, 83, singer-songwriter
 October 23 – Leon Bibb, 93, folk singer
 October 25 – Lee Shaw, 89, pianist and composer
 October 26 – David Rodriguez, 63, singer-songwriter
 October 27 – Herbie Goins, 76, R&B singer (Blues Incorporated)
 November 2
Tommy Overstreet, 78, country singer-songwriter and guitarist
David Stock, 76, composer and conductor
 November 6  – Chuck Pyle, 70, country-folk singer-songwriter
 November 7  – Eddie Hoh, 71, drummer
 November 10
Robert Craft, 92 conductor
Allen Toussaint, 77, singer-songwriter, pianist, and producer
 November 15 – P. F. Sloan, 70, singer-songwriter
 November 16 – Betty Ann Grove, 86, singer
 November 17 
Al Aarons, 83, trumpet player (Count Basie Orchestra)
David VanLanding, 51, singer (Michael Schenker Group)
 November 18 – Daniel Ferro, 94 opera singer 
 November 21 – Joseph Silverstein, 83, violinist and conductor
 November 23 – Cynthia Robinson, 71, trumpet player and singer (Sly and the Family Stone)
 November 26 – Ronnie Bright, 77, singer (The Cadillacs and The Coasters) 
 November 29 – Buddy Moreno, 103, singer
 December 1 – Shirley Gunter, 81, R&B singer-songwriter
 December 2 
John Eaton, 85, composer
Wally Roker, 78, singer (The Heartbeats)
 December 3  – Scott Weiland, 48, rock singer-songwriter (Stone Temple Pilots, Velvet Revolver, and The Wondergirls)
 December 8  
Mattiwilda Dobbs, 90, soprano
Bonnie Lou, 91, country singer-songwriter
Gary Marker, 72, bass player (Rising Sons)
 December 9  – Rusty Jones, 73, jazz drummer
 December 13 – Luigi Creatore, 92, songwriter and producer
 December 14 – Edmund Lyndeck, 90, singer
 December 16 – Snuff Garrett, 77, record producer
 December 19 – Kurt Masur, 88, conductor (New York Philharmonic)
 December 21 – Sam Dockery, 86, jazz pianist
 December 24 – William Guest, 74, R&B singer (Gladys Knight & the Pips)
 December 28
Joe Houston, 89, saxophonist
Lemmy Kilmister, 70, cancer
 December 31 
Natalie Cole, 65, singer-songwriter
Marion James, 81, blues singer-songwriter

See also 
 2010s in music
 2015 in music

References